Anastasia is a surname. Notable people with this surname include the following:

Albert Anastasia (1902 – 1957), American mobster
Antônio Anastasia (born 1961), Brazilian politician
Aravina Anastasia (born 1983), Russian actress
Flavio Anastasia (born 1969), Italian cyclist
George Anastasia (born 1947), American writer
Ino Anastasia (died 593), Byzantine empress consort
Lawrence Anastasia (1926 – 2008), American politician
Masayu Anastasia (born 1984), Indonesian model and actress

See also

Anastasi (surname)
Anastasio